Atlético Monte Azul, commonly referred to as Monte Azul, is a professional association football club based in Monte Azul Paulista, São Paulo, Brazil. The team competes in Campeonato Paulista Série A2, the second tier of the São Paulo state football league. The stadium, Estádio Otacília Patrício Arroyo, is located at 33, Rua Monteiro Lobato.

History
Atlético Monte Azul were founded on April 28, 1920, by several people, including José Cione, who suggested the name Monte Azul. In the late 1940s, the club professionalized their football department, and joined the Campeonato Paulista in 1950. The club won the Campeonato Paulista Segunda Divisão in 2004. Monte Azul won the Campeonato Paulista Série A2 in 2009, after beating Rio Branco in the final. thus being promoted to compete in the 2010 Campeonato Paulista.

Stadium
Monte Azul play their home games at Estádio do Atlético Monte Azul, commonly known as AMA. The stadium has a maximum capacity of 11,109 people.

Current squad (selected)

Out on loan

Achievements

 Campeonato Paulista Série A2:
 Winners (1): 2009
 Campeonato Paulista Segunda Divisão:
 Winners (1): 2004

References

External links
 Official website

Association football clubs established in 1920
Football clubs in São Paulo (state)
1920 establishments in Brazil